Silver Strand Falls drops 574 feet (175m) along Meadow Brook, at the western end of Yosemite Valley, within Yosemite National Park.  The falls are commonly thought to drop 1170 feet (356m); this is incorrect.  The name Widow's Tears had been applied to Silver Strand Falls in the past, but the lower-volume waterfall located one drainage to the east of Meadow Brook is now known as Widow's Tears and is thought to drop , hence the confusion regarding the height.

The origin of the number "1,170 feet" for the height either of this or of nearby Widow's Tears is obscure. But in any case, this height is not supported either by a field survey or by the topo sheet.

Since both Silver Strand and Widow's Tears are located on streams draining small, relatively low areas, they both dry up completely in a normal year by mid June since they are fed exclusively by melting snow.

References

External links
https://www.world-of-waterfalls.com/yosemite-silver-strand-falls.html

Waterfalls of Yosemite National Park
Waterfalls of Mariposa County, California
Horsetail waterfalls